René Hake (born 18 December 1971) is a Dutch football coach. He is currently the head coach of Go Ahead Eagles

Managerial statistics

External links
René Hake at Footballdatabase

1971 births
Living people
Dutch football managers
FC Emmen managers
FC Twente managers
SC Cambuur managers
FC Utrecht managers
Eredivisie managers
People from Coevorden
FC Twente non-playing staff
PEC Zwolle non-playing staff
Go Ahead Eagles managers
Sportspeople from Drenthe